"Every Mile a Memory" is a song co-written and recorded by American country music artist Dierks Bentley. It was released in July 2006 as the first single from his 2006 album Long Trip Alone. It became Bentley's fourth number one hit on the US Billboard Hot Country Songs chart in November 2006, the same week that the album was at number one on the Top Country Albums chart. Bentley wrote this song with Steve Bogard and Brett Beavers.

Content
The song tells the story of a man missing a woman and how everything he sees and hears evokes her memory.

Critical reception
Deborah Evans Price of Billboard magazine reviewed the song favorably, calling it a "potent single that continues to demonstrate the irresistible chemistry that occurs when a great singer meets a memorable tune." She goes on to say that Bentley "really knows how to sell a song, and he gets the job done on this well-written track." On the production, she calls it "deft" and states that it "underscores the ache in each word." In 2017, Billboard contributor Chuck Dauphin put "Every Mile a Memory" at number five on his top 10 list of Bentley's best songs.

Music video
The music video was directed by Russell Thomas and premiered on July 28, 2006. It was made to promote his live 2006 TV special, "Live & Loud At The Filmore". Shot in a grainy texture, it features black-and-white footage of Dierks in concert, and yellow footage of him driving a truck and motorcycle down a highway with the sun in his face.

Chart performance
"Every Mile a Memory" debuted at number 45 on the U.S. Billboard Hot Country Songs for the week of July 15, 2006.

Year-end charts

Certifications

References

2006 singles
2006 songs
Country ballads
2000s ballads
Dierks Bentley songs
Capitol Records Nashville singles
Song recordings produced by Brett Beavers
Songs written by Brett Beavers
Songs written by Dierks Bentley
Songs written by Steve Bogard